Dingus is an English word for a fool or incompetent person. It may also refer to:

 Brenda Dingus, American astrophysicist
 Eric Dingus (born 1995), American musician
 Dingus, Kentucky, an unincorporated location
 title character of Dirty Dingus Magee, a 1970 Western film starring Frank Sinatra
 "Dirty" Dingus McDuck, a Disney character who is Scrooge McDuck's grandfather

See also
 Śmigus-Dyngus, a Polish holiday, called Dyngus Day by Polish Americans